Duck Game is a 2D action game developed by Landon Podbielski and published by Adult Swim Games. The game was released for the Ouya in 2014, and for Microsoft Windows in 2015. A PlayStation 4 version was released in August 2017, and a Nintendo Switch version was released in May 2019. A major update was released in November 2020 on PC, with an upcoming release on the Switch.

Gameplay
Duck Game is a 2D video game that features primarily shooting and platforming mechanics. The game has a single-player arcade mode where the user can complete challenges to get tickets, which can be used to unlock in-game hats and game modifiers (such as Moon gravity or explosive props), as well as local or online multiplayer with up to four other players. Duck Game has a simple premise: players die in one hit, and last player standing wins the round. The game features a simple control scheme: beyond basic movement controls, the player can pick up/throw a weapon, use their equipped weapon, strafe (walk backwards), quack, and ragdoll.  Similar to fighting games, angled shots and some other maneuvers require precisely timed input combinations.

Duck Game has several unique elements, including multiple hats, a quack button, and a ragdoll button.

Development
Duck Game was developed by Vancouver-based developer Landon Podbielski. Podbielski originally planned to make a 2D platformer inspired by James Pond 3. A friend suggested adding a local multiplayer mode with guns and other weapons. The game was released for the Ouya on May 13, 2014. At launch, the game only featured a multiplayer mode, however in November 2014, single-player modes were added. 

The game was released for Microsoft Windows on June 4, 2015, published by Adult Swim Games. Podbielski previously composed the music for Super Puzzle Platformer Deluxe, a game developed by his friend, Andrew Morrish and published by Adult Swim Games on May 24, 2013. The company offered to publish Duck Game if Podbielski implemented an online multiplayer mode. After struggling to develop a client-server based networking model, Adult Swim Games extended their deadline and allowed Podbielski to use a peer-to-peer system instead. At the 2015 PlayStation Experience, a PlayStation 4 version of the game was announced, with its release following on August 22, 2017.  On May 1, 2019 it was released on the Nintendo Switch.

Reception

Duck Game received generally positive reviews from critics and players. The game received an average Metacritic score of 82 based on six reviews. Critics cite the multiplayer as driving the game's appeal. Reviewers likened the game to other successful 2D brawlers, including Super Smash Bros. Brawl, TowerFall, and Samurai Gunn.  Chris Compendio of DualShockers enjoyed the humorous aspects of the game, stating that "it just tickles your brain and finds a sweet spot of sense underneath the surrealism.” Otto Kratky appreciated the game's depth, praising the nuances of the game's combat and controls.

Sean Flint was critical of the name choice, saying "it describes absolutely nothing about it other than the fact that it may contain ducks". Opinions on the game's learning curve were mixed; Chris Compendio found the fast-paced multiplayer mode and a lack of helpful tutorials to be disorienting. Steven Hanson enjoyed the frenetic moments of the multiplayer, stating that "It’s not the assortment of weapons that is fun, it’s the quick reflexes — and their funny failures — needed to remember how they all work, despite the simple two button layout." Several reviewers have complained about the inconsistent level design, and lack of an engaging single player experience.

The game has had a small but committed competitive scene since launch, with gameplay mostly consisting of exploits to elevate the skill ceiling.

References

2014 video games
Action video games
Multiplayer and single-player video games
Nintendo Switch games
Ouya games
Platform fighters
PlayStation 4 games
Video games with Steam Workshop support
Windows games
Video games developed in Canada
Adult Swim games